John Ball Brisbin (January 10, 1827 – March 22, 1898) was an American lawyer and politician.

Biography
Brisbin was born in Schuylerville, New York and went to the Troy and Schuylerville public schools. He graduated from Yale College and studied law. In 1849, Brisbin was admitted to the New York bar. In 1853, Brisbin moved to Saint Paul, Minnesota Territory and continued to practice law. Brisbin served in the Minnesota Territorial Council in 1856 and 1857 and was president of the territorial council. He was a Democrat. He was elected to the Minnesota Territorial House of Representatives for the 1858-1859 session which never met in session. He did serve in the Minnesota House of Representatives in 1863. Brisbin served as Saint Paul city attorney in 1855 and as mayor of Saint Paul in 1857 and 1858.

He married Almira George on February 20, 1850. She died in 1863, and he remarried to Margaret M. Jones on May 3, 1865. They had one daughter together.

Brisbin died from heart disease at his home in Saint Paul on March 22, 1898.

Notes

1827 births
1898 deaths
People from Saratoga County, New York
Mayors of Saint Paul, Minnesota
Yale College alumni
Minnesota lawyers
New York (state) lawyers
Democratic Party members of the Minnesota House of Representatives
Members of the Minnesota Territorial Legislature
19th-century American politicians
19th-century American lawyers